Barbara Ann Teer (June 18, 1937 – July 21, 2008) was an American writer, producer, teacher, actress and social visionary. In 1968, she founded Harlem's National Black Theatre, the first revenue-generating black theater arts complex in the U.S.

Early life 
Teer was born in East St. Louis, Illinois, to Fred L. and Lila B. Teer, well known as dedicated educators and community leaders. Early in her life, Barbara demonstrated extraordinary gifts and talents. At 15, she graduated from Lincoln High School in East St. Louis. At 19, she graduated magna cum laude with a bachelor's degree in dance education from the University of Illinois, Urbana-Champaign, and immediately travelled to study dance with Antoine Decroaux in Paris and with Mary Wigman in Berlin.  Her sister, Frederika Teer, was a Congress Of Racial Equality Field Secretary (organizer) in the north & mid-South from 1960.  She and Genevieve Hughes were the first women to hold the title.

Career in the theatre 
Following her international travels, Teer came to New York City, where she pursued a career as a professional dancer. She studied with Alwin Nikolais at the Henry Street Playhouse and Syvilla Fort (Katherine Dunham Technique). She toured with the Alvin Ailey Dance Company, Louis Johnson Dance Company and the Pearl Bailey Las Vegas Revue. In 1961, Teer made her Broadway debut as dance captain in the Tony award-winning musical Kwamina, which was choreographed by Agnes de Mille. Teer performed in the film version of Ossie Davis's stage play Purlie Victorious. After a knee injury in 1962, Teer switched her primary artistic focus from dance to theatre. She studied with notable actors including Sanford Meisner, Paul Mann, Lloyd Richards, and Phillip Burton. Teer crafted a lucrative and successful acting career, receiving numerous accolades, including a Drama Desk Award and several Obie Awards. Between 1961 and 1966, she continued to perform on and off-Broadway as well as in television and film.

Teer grew disillusioned with the negative stereotypes she came across in her quest for responsible acting roles, making an exception to appear in the 1969 motion picture "Slaves." . In 1963, she co-founded The Group Theatre Workshop with Robert Hooks, which later became the Negro Ensemble Company. Arguing for independence from the white-dominated mainstream, she wrote in a 1968 article in The New York Times: 
We must begin building cultural centers where we can enjoy being free, open and black, where we can find out how talented we really are, where we can be what we were born to be and not what we were brainwashed to be, where we can literally 'blow our minds' with blackness.

National Black Theatre 

In 1968, with the emerging cultural consciousness of the African experience, Teer decided to found a new theatrical institution committed to cultural transformation, social change, and historical innovation within African-American communities. Leaving a flourishing career, and following in the activist footsteps of her older sister Fredrica (who had been an organizer with Eldridge Cleaver and Stokley Carmichael), Teer founded the National Black Theatre (NBT). Its mission was self-empowerment, liberation, truth and training for a new generation of artists and creative entrepreneurs. Over five decades, Teer was an agent of change and an eminent curator of the African cultural heritage.

Her representation of authentic cultural traditions of people of African descent born in America was unprecedented. She fashioned a new cultural paradigm by organizing a spiritual and artistic community of people who were conscious of their responsibility as "institution builders."

Methodology 
In addition to her role as a pioneer of Black theatre that reached beyond America, she developed a groundbreaking methodology taught exclusively at the National Black Theatre called "TEER: The Technology of Soul." TEER Technology utilized the symbolism, rituals, and mythology of authentic West African traditions. It shifted the traditional paradigm of Western theatre from a "self-conscious" art form to "God-conscious" art, allowing artistic expression which thrived on audience participation and was based on "call and response" dialogue embodied in the Black church. The creative process removed the two-dimensional "psychic distance" existing between the artist on stage and the audience. She called it a "Ritualistic Revival — theatre art that flows from the heart."

Schools and cadre trainings 
During the 1970s, NBT continued to be a fertile training ground for actors, singers, dancers, and musicians within the Harlem community and beyond. In 1974, Teer founded the Children's School for the Development of Intuitive and God-Conscious Art (CSDIG). Having recently become a mother, she wanted to create a nurturing, loving, and empowering environment in which the children of NBT staff could grow, learn, and thrive in a self-affirming and unfettered manner. A concept ahead of its time, CSDIG enabled the NBT staff to bring their children to work with them and provided them with a priceless education.

Teer wrote, directed and produced a substantial and impressive body of work, including ritualistic revivals (plays) and interactive artistic reviews. She believed theatre and artistic expression were sublime sources of healing and nurturing for the Black community and, in fact, for all of humanity.

Self-determination and real estate 
Her unwavering commitment to exploring African artistic expression was complemented by the belief that artists should also be owners/entrepreneurs within the communities where they live, work and serve. Teer viewed artistic expression and ownership as a formidable power source for generating social and political change. In that vein, she purchased a city block of property in Central Harlem on a major business corridor at 125th Street and Fifth Avenue. The National Black Theatre was the sponsoring developer for a  real estate project that became the first revenue-generating Black Theatre Arts Complex in the country.

Honors 
For her decades of inspiration and cultural advocacy, Teer was the recipient of an Honorary Doctorate of Law degree from the University of Rochester and an Honorary Doctorate of Humane Letters degree from the University of Southern Illinois.

Personal life 
Teer had an early marriage to actor Godfrey Cambridge (1962–65). After that union ended, she had two children with Michael Adeyemi Lythcott: Michael F. "Omi" Lythcott and Barbara A. "Sade" Lythcott, CEO of The National Black Theatre.

References

Further reading
 Barbara Lewis, "Ritual Reformulations: Barbara Ann Teer and the National Black Theatre of Harlem", in Annemarie Bean (ed.), A Sourcebook of African-American Plays, People, Movements, Routledge, 1999, pp. 68–82.
 Charlie Russell, "Barbara Ann Teer: We Are Liberators, Not Actors", Essence, March 1971, pp. 48–52.

External links
 Bruce Weber, Theater: "Barbara Ann Teer, 71, Dies; Promoted Black Arts", New York Times, July 25, 2008.
 Barbara Ann Teer biography at IMDb
 "Who Is NBT: Words Directly From Dr. Barbara Ann Teer". Barbara Ann Teer Interview On Folkways Part 1, 1973.
 "Proclamation For Dr. Barbara Ann Teer", Harlem World, October 30, 2008.
 "Dr. Barbara Ann Teer, 1937 – 2008", Harlem Torch.
 National Black Theatre website

1937 births
2008 deaths
African-American female dancers
American female dancers
Dancers from Illinois
African-American dancers
People from East St. Louis, Illinois
People from Harlem
University of Illinois alumni
Place of death missing
American writers
Actresses from Illinois
Actresses from New York City
20th-century American women writers
Writers from Illinois
African-American actresses
American stage actresses
20th-century American dancers
20th-century African-American women writers
20th-century African-American writers
21st-century African-American people
21st-century African-American women